The SAI KZ I was a sport aircraft built in Denmark in 1937, the first aircraft built by the Kramme & Zeuthen firm.

Design and development
The KZ I was a low-wing cantilever monoplane of conventional design, with fixed tailwheel undercarriage and an open cockpit with a single seat. Construction throughout was of wood.

Only a single KZ I was constructed, and it disappeared during the course of World War II. During the 1970s, a flying replica was built, with work started by Gunnar Fjord Christensen in 1972 and sold to the Danmarks Flymuseum in 1977. The completed aircraft, powered by a more powerful but heavier ,  Volkswagen flat-four engine, flew for the first time on 20 November 1988 and in 2008 remains part of the museum's collection.

Specifications

References

Further reading

External links

 Уголок неба

Skandinavisk Aero Industri aircraft
1930s Danish sport aircraft
Low-wing aircraft
Single-engined tractor aircraft
Aircraft first flown in 1937